François Auguste Damas (October 2, 1773 – September 7, 1812) was a French general of brigade. He was the brother of François-Étienne de Damas. He was killed at the Battle of Borodino.

1773 births
1812 deaths
French commanders of the Napoleonic Wars
French military personnel of the French Revolutionary Wars
Francois Auguste
Names inscribed under the Arc de Triomphe
French military personnel killed in the Napoleonic Wars